Leipzig-Rückmarsdorf station is a railway station in Leipzig, the largest city of Saxony, Germany, located in the Rückmarsdorf district.

References

Rückmarsdorf
Rückmarsdorf